Notagonum delaruei is a species of ground beetle in the subfamily Platyninae. It was described by Liebherr in 2005.

References

Notagonum
Beetles described in 2005